David Suvanto (born August 18, 1994) is a Swedish ice hockey player. He is currently playing with Löwen Frankfurt of the DEL2 (Germany).

Suvanto made his Swedish Hockey League debut playing with Leksands IF during the 2013–14 SHL season.

References

External links

1994 births
Living people
Swedish ice hockey left wingers
Löwen Frankfurt players